Richard Van Perry (born June 18, 1942) is an American record producer. He began as a performer in his adolescence while attending Poly Prep, his high school in Brooklyn. After graduating from college he rose through the late 1960s and early 1970s to become a successful and popular record producer with more than 12 gold records to his credit by 1982. From 1978 to 1983, he ran his own record label, Planet Records, which scored a string of hits with the main act on its roster, pop/R&B group The Pointer Sisters. After Planet's sale to RCA Records, Perry continued his work in the music industry as an independent producer. With hit records stretching from the 1960s through the 2000s, his successful modern releases include albums by Rod Stewart and Carly Simon.

Early life
Born in Brooklyn, New York City, Perry came to his interest in rock music young. Perry has Jewish ancestry. He has 3 younger brothers. His brother, Fred Perry, who lives in New York, helped work as a promoter at Planet Records in the late 1980s. His parents sold and manufactured musical instruments and also served as musical teachers. He was classically trained on piano, guitar, drums, bass and oboe, and was a member of a doo-wop group in the 1950s called the Escorts, who were subsequently signed to Coral Records. In 1955, at the age of 12, he attended the first of Alan Freed's live rock shows at the Paramount Theatre. He began his career in rock music as a local performer during his adolescence. He attended Poly Prep Country Day School and graduated in 1960. After graduating from the University of Michigan (BMus ’64), he shifted into songwriting and acting briefly, working at Kama Sutra Records in its marketing division, collaborating with Kenny Vance. Perry was launched on his career as a producer, with early projects including Captain Beefheart's debut Safe as Milk and Fats Domino's Fats Is Back. In 1967, Perry moved to Los Angeles and in 1968 produced God Bless Tiny Tim, the debut album of Reprise Records artist Tiny Tim. The album was Perry's first charting hit, reaching No. 7 on Billboard magazine's Pop Albums chart.

1970s and 1980s
Perry was well established as a producer by 1970. His credits during the subsequent decade include albums by Harry Nilsson (Nilsson Schmilsson, Son of Schmilsson), Barbra Streisand (Stoney End, Barbra Joan Streisand, Live Concert at the Forum), Carly Simon (No Secrets, Hotcakes, Playing Possum), Art Garfunkel (Breakaway), Diana Ross (Baby It's Me), Martha Reeves (Martha Reeves), Manhattan Transfer (Coming Out), Leo Sayer (Leo Sayer), and Andy Williams (Solitaire). Among his projects was the 1973 album Ringo, by Beatles drummer Ringo Starr. The album featured work by the other three Beatles and reached No. 2 on the Pop Albums chart.  Another high point was his work with Fanny. Perry produced the group's first three albums, Fanny (1970), Charity Ball, which featured the top 40 title track (1971), and Fanny Hill (1972).

According to AllMusic's Bruce Eder, the 1970s found Perry "the most renowned producer in the field of popular music"; Eder goes on to indicate that "his mere involvement with a recording project was enough to engender a mention in the music trade papers and even the popular music press, and the array of gold- and platinum-selling albums with which he was associated made his name synonymous with success." As early as 1973, Village Voice said of Perry that "the rungs on the ladder of success seem so much closer together when Perry is your guide."

In 1978, Perry launched his own label, Planet Records, which he ran for six years until its 1983 sale to RCA, by which point Perry had produced throughout his career at least fifteen gold records (four of which had gone platinum) and a dozen gold singles. Perry had achieved these figures by February 2, 1982. Among the label's roster during his tenure were acts such as Billy Thermal, Bates Motel, the Plimsouls, the Cretones, Bill Medley, Sue Saad and the Next, and the Pointer Sisters, whose charting album Energy was the label's debut. After leaving Planet Records, Perry continued producing some of its acts, including the Pointer Sisters, as well as producing efforts by such artists as Streisand, Donna Summer, Julio Iglesias, Neil Diamond, and Randy Travis. While pursuing these projects, Perry spent the latter part of the 1980s also pulling together a passion project, 1989's Rock, Rhythm & Blues, which featured contemporary artists like Elton John, Rick James, and Chaka Khan performing classic rock songs by musicians of the 1950s and early 1960s. Also in 1978, Perry played the part of a record producer in the film American Hot Wax, which was based on the life of disc jockey Alan Freed.

1990s and 2000s
In the 1990s and the 2000s, Perry worked with Ray Charles on 1993's My World, which was a minor chart success, reaching No. 145 on Billboard 200.  He is credited with helping to craft Rod Stewart's charting pop standards albums in the Great American Songbook series, including It Had to Be You: The Great American Songbook. Perry would go on to co-produce the first three records in the series. In 2004, he reunited with Carly Simon. The resultant collaboration was 2005's Moonlight Serenade, which reached No. 7 on the Billboard 200 and was also a top Internet download. In 2006, he re-entered the studio with another previous collaborator, Art Garfunkel, receiving both producer and singing credits on 2007's Some Enchanted Evening.

Personal life
Perry was married to actress Rebecca Broussard from 1987 to 1988. They had no children together. 

Perry and Jane Fonda were in a relationship from 2009 to 2017.

References

External links
Official website

Record producers from New York (state)
People from Brooklyn
University of Michigan alumni
1942 births
Living people
Poly Prep alumni
American people of Jewish descent
People with Parkinson's disease